The 2008–09 season will be Dunfermline Athletic's 2nd season in the Scottish First Division after being relegated from the Scottish Premier League in 2007.

Review and Events

Chronological list of events
This is a list of the significant events to occur at the club during the 2008–09 season, presented in chronological order. This list does not include transfers, which are listed in the transfers section below, or match results, which are in the results section.

4 July: The Pars undertake their pre-season tour of Austria, playing two games against foreign opponents.
5 July: Dunfermline, along with fellow First Division sides Dundee and Ross County are removed from the SFA's Youth Football initiative after all three sides fail to comply with rules regarding coaching disclosures.
26 July: The club win in the First Round of the Scottish Challenge Cup, beating Stirling Albion 3–0.
5 August: Dunfermline win in the First Round of the Scottish League Cup, beating Peterhead 2–0.
9 August: New striker Andy Kirk scores his first two goals for the Pars in a 2–1 home win over Queen of the South. This is also Dunfermline's first league win of the 2008–09 season.
20 August: Dunfermline lose in the Second Round of the Scottish Challenge Cup, losing against Queen of the South.
26 August: The club progress to the Third Round of the Scottish League Cup, beating Second Division side Alloa 1–0.
31 August: Former Pars player Jamie Dolan dies of a heart attack whilst out jogging.
23 September: The Pars defeat Scottish Premier League side St Mirren 2–0 at home to progress to the Quarter-finals of the Scottish League Cup.
11 October: Jim McIntyre picks up the Scottish Football League award for First Division Manager of the Month in September.
28 October: Dunfermline are defeated by SPL side Dundee Utd in the Quarter-finals of the Scottish League Cup.
10 January: Dunfermline defeat fellow Scottish First Division side Clyde in the Fourth Round of the Scottish Cup.

League table

Results

Pre-season

Scottish First Division

Scottish Cup

Scottish League Cup

Scottish Challenge Cup

Stats

Squad

|}
Notes:
¹ Denotes player has left the club.
 Player substitutions are not included.
 Last updated: 2008-12-15

Goalscorers
Fourteen players have scored for the Pars first team during the 2008–09 season, with 33 goals being scored in total in all competitions. The top goalscorer so far is Andy Kirk with 9 goals.

Discipline 
So far during the 2008–09 season, two Pars players have been sent off and fourteen have received at least one caution. In total, the team have received two red card and thirty three yellow cards, with Scott Wilson having received the most number of cards (nine cautions).

Transfers

In 
The Pars brought in 5 players in the close season. Midfielder Steven Bell agreed a pre-contract move in January 2008 from relegated side Stirling Albion. Bell, along with Graeme Holmes who signed from Airdrie United and Austin McCann from Notts County officially signed for the club on 2008-05-19. Striker Graham Bayne signed from Inverness CT for £30,000 in late June, with former Rangers keeper Calum Reidford joining in July after a successful trial with the club. German striker Joseph Laumann also joined the Pars on trial in July, but was not offered a contract. Northern Ireland international Andy Kirk was brought back to Scotland by manager Jim McIntyre from Yeovil Town at the beginning of August for an undisclosed amount and Midfielder Simon Wiles was brought in on a one-year-deal from Blackpool after impressing during a trial. Ross Campbell was brought in on a months loan from Scottish Premier League side Hibernian on 2008-09-19. Rangers Reserve striker Rory Loy signed halfway through December on a months loan until 2009-01-26. In January, the Pars brought Hearts young striker Jamie Mole on loan for the remainder of the season.

Out 
6 of the Pars first team players from the 2007–08 season left the club in the summer on free transfers. Stephen Simmons, Darren Young, Stevie Crawford and Aaron Labonte all became free agents when their contracts ran out, while Scott Morrison and Mark Burchill signed pre-contracts with Ross County and Rotherham respectively. Young goalkeeper Sean Murdoch opted to join recently promoted side Hamilton Academical (with whom he'd previously been on loan) and at the start of September, Centre-back Sol Bamba joining SPL side Hibernian for an undisclosed sum. September also saw young defender Greg Ross join Second Division side Cowdenbeath on a months loan.

References

External links 
 Official Site: 2008–09 fixtures
 BBC Sport – Club Stats
 Soccerbase – Results | Squad stats | Transfers

Dunfermline Athletic F.C. seasons
Dunfermline